Dupaty is a French surname. Notable people with the surname include:

Charles Dupaty (1771–1825), French sculptor
Emmanuel Dupaty (1775–1851), French playwright, naval officer, singer, and journalist

French-language surnames